G. Nizamuddin (born 1 July 1954) was a member of the 14th Lok Sabha of India. He represented the Hindupur constituency of Andhra Pradesh and is a member of the Indian National Congress.

References

1954 births
Living people
Indian National Congress politicians from Andhra Pradesh
Telugu politicians
India MPs 2004–2009
Lok Sabha members from Andhra Pradesh
People from Anantapur district